Perry Green Harrington (July 9, 1812 – September 19, 1876) was an American politician and farmer.

Born in Laurens, New York, he moved to Milwaukee, Wisconsin Territory in 1836. In 1837, Harrington moved to Sugar Creek, Wisconsin Territory. He was a farmer. Harrington served on the Walworth County, Wisconsin Board of Supervisors. In 1854, Harrington served in the Wisconsin State Assembly. He died in Sugar Creek, Wisconsin.

Notes

1812 births
1876 deaths
People from Otsego County, New York
People from Sugar Creek, Wisconsin
Farmers from Wisconsin
County supervisors in Wisconsin
Members of the Wisconsin State Assembly
19th-century American politicians